= Al Subeaei Tower Complex =

General information
- Type: Office
- Location: Khobar, Saudi Arabia
- Coordinates: 26.30351°N 50.20918°E
- Completed: 2004

Height
- Antenna spire: 62 m (203 ft)

Technical details
- Floor count: 18
- Lifts/elevators: 10

Al Subeaei Tower Complex is a skyscraper located in Khobar, Saudi Arabia.

== Overview ==
The construction of Al Subeaei Tower Complex began in 2002 and was completed in 2004. The total cost of the project was $22,400,000.

It is located on King Abdul Aziz Road in the growing business district of Tahila in Khobar. It is the fourth tallest skyscraper in Khobar. It is about 62 m in height, and contains 18 floors. The complex is mainly used for commercial offices.
